The 2005–06 RCD Espanyol season was RCD Espanyol's 12th consecutive season in top-division of the Spanish football league, the La Liga, and the 106th as a football club.

Pre-season and friendlies

Competitions

Overall record

La Liga

League table

Results summary

Results by round

Matches

Copa del Rey

Round of 16

Quarter-finals

Semi-finals

Final

UEFA Cup

First round

Group stage

Knockout stage

Round of 32

References 

RCD Espanyol seasons
RCD Espanyol